Dimitrios "Dimi" Papadatos (born 4 June 1991) is a Greek-Australian professional golfer currently playing on the European Tour.

Professional career 
Papadatos turned professional in late 2012. He won his first professional event at the New Zealand Open on the PGA Tour of Australasia in March 2014.

Papadatos has established himself as one of the leading players on the PGA Tour of Australasia with two further victories, the Oates Victorian Open and the TX Civil & Logistics WA PGA Championship seeing Papadatos named the 2017 PGA Tour of Australasia Player of the Year.

In 2018, he won the Open de Portugal, his first win on the Challenge Tour. Papadatos would finish 21st on the Challenge Tour's Order of Merit, earning him conditional playing status on the 2019 European Tour.

Papadatos finished runner-up to Mexico's Abraham Ancer in the 2018 Emirates Australian Open, which saw Papadatos qualify for the 2019 Open Championship at Royal Portrush in what was Papadatos' debut major appearance. "I'm ecstatic to have qualified for The Open," Papadatos said. "To get to play with the world's best players is going to be a great experience. I dreamt about playing in The Open growing up."

Papadatos is managed by former NRL star Braith Anasta.

Professional wins (5)

PGA Tour of Australasia wins (4)

Challenge Tour wins (1)

Results in major championships
Results not in chronological order in 2020.

CUT = missed the half-way cut

NT = No tournament due to the COVID-19 pandemic

Team appearances
Amateur
Australian Men's Interstate Teams Matches (representing New South Wales): 2011, 2012 (winners)

References

External links

Australian male golfers
PGA Tour of Australasia golfers
European Tour golfers
Golfers from Sydney
Australian people of Greek descent
1982 births
Living people